13 The Shambles is an historic building in the English city of York, North Yorkshire. A Grade II* listed building, located on The Shambles, the building dates to the early 17th century, but it was refronted in the 18th century and renovated in the 19th and 20th centuries.

The timber supports that ran down to a counter and the canopy of the original open stall are now incorporated into today's façade.

As of 2020, the building is occupied The Early Grey Tea Rooms.

References

13
Houses in North Yorkshire
Buildings and structures in North Yorkshire
16th-century establishments in England
Grade II* listed buildings in York
Grade II* listed houses
16th century in York